Raley is a surname. Notable people with the surname include:

Brooks Raley (born 1988), American Major League Baseball pitcher
David Allen Raley (born before 1985), American murderer
J. Frank Raley Jr. (19262012), American politician from Maryland
John Wesley Raley (190368), American author and president of Oklahoma Baptist University
Luke Raley (born 1994), American Major League Baseball outfielder
William de Raley (before 12121250), English judge, administrator and bishop

See also
Raley, Alberta, an unincorporated community in Cardston County, Canada
Raley's Supermarkets, an American supermarket chain
Raley Field, a California stadium and home of the Sacramento River Cats minor league baseball team